Janvilliers is a commune in the Marne department in north-eastern France.

Janvilliers is not the setting for Sebastian Faulks' 1989 novel The Girl at the Lion d'Or. Although Faulks' novel is largely set in a town called Janvilliers, descriptions of the town in the book indicate that it is situated on the Atlantic Coast in Brittany.

See also
Communes of the Marne department

References

Communes of Marne (department)